Anna Kindy  (born 14 August 1962) is a Canadian freestyle skier. She was born in Montreal, Quebec. She competed at the 1992 Winter Olympics, in women's moguls.

References

External links 
 

1962 births
Living people
Canadian female freestyle skiers
Olympic freestyle skiers of Canada
Freestyle skiers at the 1992 Winter Olympics
Skiers from Montreal